The women's javelin throw event was part of the track and field athletics programme at the 1936 Summer Olympics. The competition was held on August 2, 1936.  The final was won by Tilly Fleischer of Germany.

Results

Final standings

Key: OR = Olympic record

References

Athletics at the 1936 Summer Olympics
Javelin throw at the Olympics
1936 in women's athletics
Women's events at the 1936 Summer Olympics